Krestovy (masculine), Krestovaya (feminine), or Krestovoye (neuter) is the name of several rural localities in Russia.

Modern localities
Krestovoye, a khutor in Belgorodsky District of Belgorod Oblast
Krestovaya, Novgorod Oblast, a village in Yazhelbitskoye Settlement of Valdaysky District in Novgorod Oblast
Krestovaya, Sakha Republic, a selo in Pokhodsky Rural Okrug of Nizhnekolymsky District in the Sakha Republic
Krestovaya, Smolensk Oblast, a village in Rukhanskoye Rural Settlement of Yershichsky District in Smolensk Oblast
Krestovaya, Vologda Oblast, a village in Baranovsky Selsoviet of Kaduysky District in Vologda Oblast

Abolished localities
Krestovy (rural locality), a khutor in Sarpinsky Selsoviet under the administrative jurisdiction of Krasnoarmeysky City District under the administrative jurisdiction of the city of oblast significance of Volgograd in Volgograd Oblast; abolished in March 2010

Alternative names
Krestovaya, alternative name of Krestovka, a village in Okunev Nos selo Administrative Territory of Ust-Tsilemsky District in the Komi Republic;

See also
 Krestovsky (disambiguation)
 Nature reserves in Russia